Silvère Ganvoula M'boussy (born 29 June 1996) is a Congolese professional footballer who plays as a forward for  club VfL Bochum and the Congo national team.

Club career
Ganvoula signed with Elazığspor on 5 July 2015.

He joined R.S.C. Anderlecht on a season long loan from Mechelen in 2017. and scored twice against his parent club in February 2018  He scored the winner for Anderlecht after coming on a substitute in a 2–1 win against Royal Antwerp in the Belgian First Division A on 11 March 2018.

VfL Bochum
In July 2018, Ganvoula joined 2. Bundesliga side VfL Bochum on loan for the 2018–19 season. Bochum secured an option to sign him permanently at the end of the season. In July 2019 Ganvoula was signed by Bochum. The following season, Ganvoula was Bochum's leading scorer with 13 goals in league play and 16 goals in all competitions – including a hat-trick against KSV Baunatal in the first round of the DFB-Pokal.

In January 2022, he signed for Belgian First Division A club Cercle Brugge on loan until the end of the season.

Personal life
In autumn 2017 Ganvoula had to cope with the loss of his father and only played 15 minutes between October and December for Anderlecht.

Career statistics

Club

International
Scores and results list Congo's goal tally first, score column indicates score after each Ganvoula goal.

References

External links
 
 
 
 

1996 births
Living people
Association football forwards
Republic of the Congo footballers
Republic of the Congo international footballers
Republic of the Congo youth international footballers
2015 Africa Cup of Nations players
TFF First League players
Belgian Pro League players
2. Bundesliga players
Bundesliga players
Raja CA players
Elazığspor footballers
R.S.C. Anderlecht players
K.V.C. Westerlo players
K.V. Mechelen players
VfL Bochum players
Cercle Brugge K.S.V. players
Republic of the Congo expatriate footballers
Republic of the Congo expatriate sportspeople in Morocco
Expatriate footballers in Morocco
Republic of the Congo expatriate sportspeople in Turkey
Expatriate footballers in Turkey
Republic of the Congo expatriate sportspeople in Belgium
Expatriate footballers in Belgium
Republic of the Congo expatriate sportspeople in Germany
Expatriate footballers in Germany